Frederick 'Fred' Charles was an English footballer who played as an inside forward for Sheffield United in the Football League along with spells at Doncaster Rovers and Castleford Town.

During World War I he returned to Sheffield and guested for his old club on a number of occasions, ironically featuring more than he ever had in peace time games. He also made a number of guest appearances for a number of clubs playing against United who had found themselves a player short, including Grimsby Town, Notts County, Birmingham and Hull City.

References

English Football League players
Association football inside forwards
Doncaster Rovers F.C. players
Sheffield United F.C. players
Castleford Town F.C. players
Birmingham City F.C. wartime guest players
Mexborough Town F.C. players
Hull City A.F.C. players
Grimsby Town F.C. players
Notts County F.C. wartime guest players
Year of death missing
Year of birth missing
Midland Football League players
English footballers